Epicephala domina is a moth of the family Gracillariidae. It is found in China (Hainan).

The length of the forewings is 7.5−11 mm. The forewings are greyish brown to deep brown with three pairs of white striae from both the costal and dorsal margins at two-fifths, three-fifths and four-fifths extending obliquely outward to the middle as well as to end and outside of the cell. The third dorsal striae is broader and
more distinct. The dorsal margin has a broad white band extending from the base to the tornal area and there is a narrow silvery-white fascia with metallic reflection from the costal six-seventh to the dorsal margin. The distal one-seventh is yellowish brown, with a central black dot and with a triangular white dot near the costa and a white streak along the dorsal margin. The hindwings are greyish brown.

The larvae feed on seeds in the fruits of Glochidion sphaerogynum.

Etymology
The species name refers to the status of the species as the dominant Epicephala species associated with G. sphaerogynum and is derived from Latin dominus (meaning master, lord).

References

Epicephala
Moths described in 2015
Moths of Asia